Frederick William Hilgendorf (23 January 1874 – 24 September 1942) was a New Zealand teacher, lecturer and agricultural scientist. He was born in Waihola, South Otago, New Zealand on 23 January 1874.

In 1935, he was awarded the King George V Silver Jubilee Medal. The Hilgendorf Wing at Lincoln University was named after him.

References

1874 births
1942 deaths
New Zealand educators
New Zealand scientists
New Zealand academics
People from Otago